Narap (also Romanized as Narāp; also known as Nar Āb) is a village in Eskelabad Rural District, Nukabad District, Khash County, Sistan and Baluchestan Province, Iran. At the 2006 census, its population was 1,118, in 3 families.

References 

Populated places in Khash County